Nick Drahos (December 6, 1918 – May 12, 2018) was an American football end. He played college football at Cornell University and was a member of the Sphinx Head Society. He was elected to the College Football Hall of Fame in 1981. Drahos died from pneumonia in Holland, Michigan in May 2018 at the age 99.

References

1918 births
2018 deaths
All-American college football players
American football ends
American football tackles
College Football Hall of Fame inductees
Cornell Big Red football players
People from Ford City, Pennsylvania
Players of American football from Pennsylvania
Deaths from pneumonia in Michigan